Patrizia Casagrande Esposto (26 October 1951 – 12 December 2017) was an Italian politician and member of the Democratic Party. She served as the President of the Province of Ancona from 28 May 2007 until 12 October 2014.

Casagrande died on 12 December 2017, at the age of 66.

References

1951 births
2017 deaths
Presidents of the Province of Ancona
Democratic Party (Italy) politicians
21st-century Italian politicians
21st-century Italian women politicians
People from Senigallia